"I've Got My Love to Keep Me Warm" is a popular song copyrighted in 1937 by its composer, Irving Berlin, and first recorded by (i) Ray Noble (January 5, 1937), Howard Barrie, vocalist, and (ii) Red Norvo (January 8, 1937), Mildred Bailey, vocalist. The song – sung by Dick Powell and Alice Faye – debuted on film February 12, 1937, in the musical, On the Avenue.

Background
The Noble, Norvo, and film renditions were successful that year, as well as other 1937 recordings that included Billie Holiday and Glen Gray (vocal by Kenny Sargent).

Les Brown's instrumental version, arranged by Skip Martin and recorded in 1946 as Columbia #38324, became a million-seller and Billboard top ten song in 1949.  Brown said that he got a call from Columbia Records after he performed the song telling him to record it, only to respond that he had recorded it three years earlier. That same year, vocal group The Mills Brothers also had a chart hit with their version on Decca #24550.

Other recordings

Although not strictly a Christmas song as the lyrics make no mention of the holiday, it has been recorded for many artists' Christmas albums and is a standard part of the holiday song repertoire in the U.S. Artists such as Rosemary Clooney, Doris Day, Dean Martin, Bette Midler,  Rod Stewart, Dinah Washington and Idina Menzel (in a duet with Billy Porter) are among those who have covered it.  Ella Fitzgerald recorded this for her 1958 Verve release Ella Fitzgerald Sings the Irving Berlin Songbook.

During the Big Band era, the song was also recorded by several leading "sweet jazz bands" including Shep Fields and his Rippling Rhythm Orchestra in 1937.

Bibliography

Annotations

Notes

References

 
 

  ; .

  ; ; .

 

  ; ; .
 
 
 
 

  ; ; .
 
 
 

 

  ; ; .
 
 
 
 
 
 
 
 
 
 

1937 songs
Songs written by Irving Berlin
American Christmas songs
Ella Fitzgerald songs
Kimberley Locke songs
Billie Holiday songs
Mildred Bailey songs
1930s jazz standards
Songs written for films
Songs about weather